Drawsko is a lake located nearby the town of Czaplinek in the West Pomeranian Voivodeship, Poland. It is 1,956 hectares large, 12,6 km long and 3.9 km wide. Maximum depth is 79.7 m, making it the second deepest lake in Poland (after Hańcza Lake).

External links 
 Drawsko lake, polish site of Drawsko, describe, photo, 2011

Drawsko County
Lakes of West Pomeranian Voivodeship